Carl Friedrich Rungenhagen (first name also sometimes given as Karl; 27 September 1778 – 21 December 1851) was a German composer and music teacher.

Life
Rungenhagen abandoned early study of art under Daniel Chodowiecki and joined his father's trading company. He worked there from 1796 to his father's death, after which he devoted himself entirely to music.

Rungenhagen became a member of the Sing-Akademie zu Berlin in 1801 and was a student of Carl Friedrich Zelter. In 1815 he became its deputy director, and took over its management in 1833 as successor to Zelter. Rungenhagen's election to his post by the Akademie's General Assembly was not without controversy. Among the competitors was Zelter's pupil Felix Mendelssohn. Mendelssohn's famous successful revival of Johann Sebastian Bach's St Matthew Passion at the Akademie in 1829 proved insufficient for him to win the post, nor did the fact that Felix and the members of the Mendelssohn family had for many years sung in, and supported, the Akademie. Some have supposed that Rungenhagen's success was due to anti-Jewish sentiment. The loss of the election may have motivated Mendelssohn to turn his back on Berlin.

As Director of the Akademie, Rungenhagen continued the revival of the music of Bach; in 1833 he conducted the first performance of Bach's St John Passion after Bach's death. In 1835 he performed an almost complete performance of Bach's Mass in B minor. Rungenhagen devoted himself to the oratorios of Handel, with five performances in 1840, but also performed contemporary oratorios, including Ruth by his student Karl Anton Eckert and his own Judith. He conducted 30 new oratorios with the Sing-Akademie. As a composer, he created mostly church music, oratorios, cantatas and songs.
 
Rungenhagen also worked at the Prussian Academy of Arts in Berlin as a music pedagogue, appointed professor in 1843. Amongst his students were Albert Lortzing, Louis Lewandowski, Stanisław Moniuszko, August Conradi and Alexander Fesca.  Rungenhagen was also a member of a Masonic Lodge in Berlin.

Rungenhagen died at the age of 73 in Berlin in December 1851, and was buried in the Dorotheenstadt cemetery. His successor as director of the Akademie was Eduard Grell.

Selected works
Aus der Tiefe ruf' ich, Herr for soprano, four-part choir and organ or piano
Friedens-Cantate Berlin, printed at W. Dieterici, 1816
Te Deum, Berlin, printed at W. Dieterici, 1816
Stabat mater dolorosa (with Latin and German text) for two soprano and one alto soloist, Op. 24, Berlin, Trautwein, 1826
Christi Einzug in Jerusalem, 1834

Notes and references
Notes

Sources
Eitner, Robert (1889), "Rungenhagen, Karl Friedrich", in Allgemeine Deutsche Biographie, vol.29. (In German). In German Wikisource at this URL. Accessed 3 Feb 2013.
Mercer-Taylor, Peter (2000). The Life of Mendelssohn. Cambridge: Cambridge University Press. .

External links

Karl Friedrich Rungenhagen at Deutsche Biographie 

1778 births
1851 deaths
German choral conductors
German male conductors (music)
German composers
Musicians from Berlin